Courageous Cat and Minute Mouse, is a 1960 children's cartoon television show, that was produced by Trans-Artists Productions, and syndicated by Tele Features Inc. The characters were originated and created by authors Bob Kane and Gerald J. Rappoport as a spoof of Kane's earlier creations, Batman and Robin.  In many ways, Courageous Cat and Minute Mouse presages the camp aspects of the later Batman live action series, which William Dozier and Howie Horwitz produced as a villain-driven action-comedy lampoon. Storyboard design was by Kane's assistant/ghost Sheldon Moldoff.

Plot
In the animated series, the pair are anthropomorphic animal superheroes without known secret identities (the green-eyed caped crimefighter and his squeaky-voiced companion are usually addressed as simply "Courageous" and "Minute") who live in the Cat Cave. When summoned via the Cat Signal over their television set, Courageous Cat and Minute Mouse race to the scene of the crime in their sleekly feline red Cat Mobile which can convert into both the extendable-winged Cat Plane and submersible Cat Boat and thwart the criminal plots of various villains who threaten Empire City. The episodes contained storylines and screenplays and characters written by authors Gerald J. Rappoport and drawings and characters by Bob Kane.

Though they fought many miscreants, the duo's recurring arch-enemy was Chauncey "Flat-Face" Frog who appeared in nearly every episode.

The five-minute length of the cartoons made the series suitable for use as interstitials or airtime fillers, especially to accommodate a movie or show that ended at an unusually early time, as well as animated content for local children's shows. The first episode was broadcast on Wednesday September 14, 1960 as part of "The Tommy Seven Show" on New York's WABC Channel 7.

Characters

Heroes
 Courageous Cat – The protector of Empire City. Whenever fighting bad guys, Courageous Cat would use his all-purpose Cat Gun or a vast variety of different deus ex machina "trick guns" he pulls out of his cape that (like the Green Arrow's trick arrows) fire whatever the situation requires like a rope, some water, a parachute, cages, boxing gloves, lightning-like magnetic rays, or even more bizarre ammunition, and even the occasional actual bullet. In case of emergency, Courageous also has extra pre-James Bond secret gadgets hidden in his belt buckle and the star emblem on his chest.
 Minute Mouse – Courageous Cat's rodent sidekick.

Supporting characters
 The Chief – A canine chief of police who calls in the "furry foes of felony" via the Cat Signal.
 Marilyn Mouse – Minute Mouse's movie star girlfriend.
 Sassy Bones – A blonde mouse who is a chanteuse at a nightclub called The Pad with whom Rodney Rodent is enamored.
 Periscope Pete – A living, breathing periscope with a bush for a body.

Villains
 Chauncey "Flat-Face" Frog – Chauncey is a chortling, cigar-smoking, derby-hatted criminal mastermind whose voice was based on Edward G. Robinson.
 Harry Gorilla – Chauncey "Flat-Face" Frog's hulking, half-witted henchman.
 Professor Shaggy Dog – A mad scientist with an Albert Einstein-like mop of white hair who is tall, thin, and bewhiskered in some episodes and short and bespectacled in others.
 Big Shot and Little Shot – A burly bulldog (who talks like James Cagney in some episodes) and his short sidekick who are generic gruff gangsters that are Chauncey "Flat-Face" Frog's rivals in crime.
 The Black Cat – A sinister thief. He is a "cat burglar" who is a caricature of Cary Grant.
 Rodney Rodent – A French-accented rat artist gone bad.
 Shoo Shoo Fly – A tiny insect whose small size belies its enormous appetite, its name is a reference to shoofly pie and the tsetse fly.
 Robber Rabbit – A gravel-voiced rabbit thug in a black turtleneck.
 Foxy the Fox – A debonair fox thief in a top hat and tuxedo.
 The Great Hambone – An egotistical canine actor and master of disguise.
 Iron Shark – A fish-shaped submarine.
 Professor Von Noodle Stroudel/Strudel – A German-accented human scientist who is not so much a villain as oblivious to the effects of his experiments on the world around him.
 Comrade and Commissar – Russian-accented, trench coat-clad foreign dog spies whom Courageous and Minute were never able to apprehend due to their "diplomatic immunity" – true Cold War villains.
 The Unmentionables and The Unthinkables – Rival gangs headed by Chauncey "Flat-Face" Frog and Big Shot. Their names are a parody of The Untouchables.
 Outrageous Cat – Courageous Cat's Wild West outlaw-style cousin who talks like Yosemite Sam.
 Screwy Squirrel-A rarely seen criminal who usually appeared as part of a group.

Voice cast
 Dallas McKennon – Courageous Cat and Minute Mouse

Episodes

Home video releases
A&E Home Video (distributed by New Video) released all 130 five-minute-long episodes on DVD in Region 1 on October 29, 2002.

Music
The memorable theme music by Johnny Holiday features a walking bass line and is fashioned after the theme for Peter Gunn. It has most notably been performed in concert by the New York Dolls and their version of the Courageous Cat Theme featured on their album Rock'n Roll (1994).  The theme was also featured in "Thousand Dollar Bill", a 1959 episode of the Mike Connors detective series Tightrope!. It also appears in "The Jackson Greene Story", a 1959 episode of The Millionaire (TV series). It was also sampled on Jay-Z's first recording "HP Gets Busy" by High Potent (1986), LL Cool J's I'm Bad (1987), and Soul Coughing's "Is Chicago, Is Not Chicago" (1994).

In 2019, Brown Bear Records released a cover of the theme by The Gavoons on Brown Bear on TV, a compilation album of covers of television themes.

Merchandise
In 1960, Simon Says Records released a 12" vinyl record entitled COURAGEOUS CAT in the story of “Around the World in a Daze” featuring Dal McKennon and Johhny Holiday performing all the voices. It runs for 24 minutes and is available to listen to on Youtube.

Other items of merchandise from the early 1960s included a Courageous Cat Sliding Squares Puzzle, a Super Slate, a Collegeville Courageous Cat halloween costume including mask, at least two coloring books, and matchbooks.

Later appearances
Reruns of Courageous Cat and Minute Mouse were shown on Nickelodeon's Weinerville in the 1990s along with reruns of Batfink and both segments of The Alvin Show.

In Germany and Austria the show was called Mirakulus und Supermaus, and was broadcast as part of the German children's television show Bim Bam Bino (1988-98) on Tele 5. Some episodes were released on VHS and DVD.

Film version
In 2012 it was announced that Evergreen Media Group had acquired the rights to produce a live action/CGI film based on Courageous Cat, but as this has not manifested it is mostly likely no longer in development.

Streaming services
All episodes are currently available to watch on Amazon Prime in the US, and most are also available on stream services PROClassicTV and PlutoTV.

References

External links
 Courageous Cat at Toon Tracker Archived from the original on May 14, 2011.
 
 Courageous Cat and Minute Mouse on Amazon Prime
 Courageous Cat and Minute Mouse on PROClassicTV

1960 American television series debuts
1962 American television series endings
1960s American animated television series
American children's animated action television series
American children's animated adventure television series
American children's animated comedy television series
American children's animated superhero television series
Characters created by Bob Kane
Animated television series about cats
Animated television series about mice and rats
First-run syndicated television programs in the United States
Parody superheroes
Television series created by Bob Kane